Chilcot is a surname. Notable people with the surname include:

 John Chilcot (born 1939), chairman of the Iraq Inquiry, referred to as the Chilcot Inquiry
 Thomas Chilcot (1707?–1766), English organist and composer

See also
Chilcott (surname)